Santo Tomás is a town and a municipality in the Chontales Department of Nicaragua.

The main economic activities are agriculture and livestock. Many of the businesses located in Santo Tomás consist of small stores owned by individuals that live next to their commercial properties. One of the oldest pharmacies in the region, Lopez Pharmacy, whose owner was cofounder of the Red Cross in Santo Tomás, is located in the town. This town is the "quesillo capitol" of Nicaragua, where the rivers run with milk and the rocks are made of the local cheese: donde los ríos son de leche y las piedras de cuajada.

Climate 
The climate is generally hot, but much more pleasant and breezy than the scorching lowlands of Managua and Leon. The rainy season typically starts in late May and runs until December. Global climate change has adversely affected the rainy seasons, negatively impacting crop production and health of livestock. In November and December, the temperature cools down considerably.

Demographic 
The municipality has a population of 19,290 (2021 estimate). 48.7% of the population are males and 51.3% females.

Religion 
The majority of the people are Catholic, with a growing number of evangelical church members. There are several evangelical churches and a Catholic church in Santo Thomás. The town boasts two patron saint days to honor and celebrate.

Education 
There is a central park with free wi-fi. There are private schools and public schools in the area. Students seeking continuing education attend a private university or travel to the national universities in the department seat of Juigapla or the capital city of Managua.

International relationships 
Santo Tomás has relationships with two international sister communities: with the non-profit organization Thurston-Santo Tomás Sister County Association (incorporated in 1989) based in Olympia, WA, USA, and an official sister city relationship with Mol, Belgium (since 1985).

Security 
Santo Tomás is a relatively safe town, where most people get along well and know their neighbors. While there is no endemic malaria in Santo Tomás, the presence of dengue and chikungunya throughout Central America necessitate preventative measures such as mosquito repellents and nighttime use of "mosquiteros".

References 

Municipalities of the Chontales Department